Idol Songs: 11 of the Best is a greatest hits album by English rock singer Billy Idol, released on 20 June 1988 by Chrysalis Records. It comprises all the singles released from his first three studio albums—Billy Idol, Rebel Yell and Whiplash Smile—as well as the live version of "Mony Mony" and re-recorded Generation X song "Dancing with Myself", both of which appeared on Idol's debut EP Don't Stop. A limited edition of the album contains two extra remixes, and another limited edition contains four extra remixes. The album reached number two on the UK Albums Chart and has been certified platinum by the British Phonographic Industry (BPI). In 2003, the album was reissued with a different title and cover as The Essential.

Track listings

Note: "Don't Need a Gun" (Melt Down Mix) was unavailable elsewhere on CD and remained exclusive to the limited edition versions. The "Mony Mony" (Hung Like a Pony Mix) was also available on the Japanese issue of the Vital Idol remix album. These two tracks have been available since 2012 on the So80s compilation.

Personnel

Kenny Aaronson – bass on "Mony Mony"
Jocelyn Brown – backing vocals on "To Be a Lover"
Sal Cuevas – bass on "Eyes Without a Face"
Terry Chimes – drums on "Dancing with Myself"
Susan Davis – keyboards on "Mony Mony"
Judi Dozier – keyboards on "Rebel Yell", "Eyes Without a Face", "Catch My Fall" and "Flesh for Fantasy"
Phil Feit – bass on "White Wedding"
Harold Faltermeyer – keyboards on "Don't Need a Gun"
Keith Forsey – drums on "Hot in the City" and "Sweet Sixteen"; Juno 60 on "To Be a Lover"; keyboards on "Sweet Sixteen"; drum programming on "Don't Need a Gun"
Connie Harvey – backing vocals on "To Be a Lover"
Billy Idol – vocals and guitars, bass on "To Be a Lover"
Tony James – bass on "Dancing with Myself"
Steve Jones – guitar on "Dancing with Myself"
Michael Klvana – additional keyboards on "Mony Mony"
Perri Lister – backing vocals on "Eyes Without a Face"
Marcus Miller – bass on "Sweet Sixteen"
Steve Missal – drums on "White Wedding"
Steve New – guitar on "Dancing with Myself"
Ainsley Otton – guitar on "Hot in the City"
Thommy Price – drums on "Rebel Yell", "Eyes Without a Face", "Catch My Fall", "Mony Mony" and "Flesh for Fantasy"
Mick Smiley – bass on "Hot in the City"
Stephanie Sprull – backing vocals on "Hot in the City"
Steve Stevens – guitar on all tracks except "Hot in the City" and "Dancing with Myself"; bass, Casio and keyboards on "Rebel Yell", "Eyes Without a Face", "Catch My Fall", "To Be a Lover" and "Flesh for Fantasy"; programming on "To Be a Lover"; bass on "Don't Need a Gun"
Richard Tell – piano on "To Be a Lover"
Steve Webster – bass on "Rebel Yell" and "Catch My Fall"
Mars Williams – saxophone on "Catch My Fall"
Janet Wright – backing vocals on "To Be a Lover"

Charts

Weekly charts

Year-end charts

Certifications

References

1988 compilation albums
Albums produced by Keith Forsey
Billy Idol albums
Chrysalis Records compilation albums